Death in Ice Valley is a 2018 true crime podcast produced by NRK, the Norwegian radio and television public broadcasting company and BBC World Service. It is authored by Marit Higraff, a Norwegian investigative journalist with NRK, and Neil McCarthy, documentary producer with BBC. The podcast follows a two-year investigation into the Isdal Woman case, concerning an unknown woman whose burned body was found in western Norway in 1970. It instigated a crowd-sourcing campaign for new leads in the investigation, gathered around the eponymous Facebook group run by World Service editor Anna Doble and journalist Beth Ryder.

Higraff makes use of modern forms of journalism, mostly podcasting. She is one of the leading experts on the case of the Isdal Woman and successfully encouraged the Bergen Police to reopen the case in 2016.

References

External links 

 Marit Higraff on de Volkskrant

NRK original programming
Crime podcasts
BBC World Service programmes
1970 in Norway